Lena Rice defeated May Jacks 6–4, 6–1 in the all comers' final to win the ladies' singles tennis title at the 1889 Wimbledon Championships. The reigning champion Blanche Hillyard did not defend her title. Despite previous draws there were only four competitors in the tournament, the smallest entry ever for any competition at Wimbledon.

Draw

All Comers'

References

External links

Ladies' Singles
Wimbledon Championship by year – Women's singles
Wimbledon Championships - Singles
Wimbledon Championships - Singles